The Cokeville Miracle is a 2015 drama film written & directed by T. C. Christensen and starring Jasen Wade, Sarah Kent and Kimball Stinger. The film was based on the Cokeville Elementary School hostage crisis in 1986 and the book The Cokeville Miracle: When Angels Intervene by Hartt Wixom and Judene Wixom. The faith-based film was released in select theaters across the United States in the summer of 2015, and was distributed by Deseret Book Company and affiliated retailers.

Plot

In May 1986, cop Ron Hartley (Jasen Wade) is at a crime scene, during which two people were murdered. He is traumatized from the experience and begins to question the beliefs of his religion.

In Tucson, Arizona, David Young (Nathan Stevens), former town marshal of Cokeville, Wyoming, tests a homemade bomb on an old bus, which succeeds. He then expresses his triumph with his second wife, Doris (Kymberly Mellen). In Cokeville, Ron is playing with his two children; Cindy (Alexa Rae) and Jason (Kimball Stinger). When the family's nightly prayer comes, Ron refuses to say it, as he is questioning his faith due to all the horrible things he's seen. His wife, Claudia (Sarah Kent), is worried for him.

On a Sunday, Ron does not attend his church with his family. Meanwhile, David is travelling with Doris, buying groceries as materials. He has his two friends Gerald Deppe and Doyle Mendenhall (Channon Voyce and Paul Hunt) meet him in Cokeville. David and Doris demonstrate igniting gunpowder while it is in the air, making it seem as if the air is on fire. Deppe and Mendenhall take the plot as launching illegal fireworks. The next day, the five set out for Cokeville Elementary School, where David reveals their real plan is to take the school hostage and blow it up with his bomb, which will then lead to David being the leader of a "brave new world". Deppe and Mendenhall refuse to cooperate, and David handcuffs them in the back of his van.

Ron, on the same day, travels to help his brother with some issues, while Cindy and Jason go to the school. During the past few days at the school, the fire alarms have been going off without any smoke or any other trigger, baffling the staff. David, Doris and Penny (Caitlin EJ Meyer), one of David's two daughters from his previous marriage, bring the bomb into the school, with Doris and Penny carrying firearms. Penny is reluctant to follow the plan. The three walk into the school undetected, and announce to their secretary, Christina Cook (Jillette Dayton), their plan. They take her hostage, and when David starts harshly yelling at a student, Penny confronts him. Instead of shooting her like he had earlier threatened, he gets his car keys and throws them at her, commanding her to leave, saying she is no daughter of his.

After Penny leaves, David and Doris take three people (two staff, one student) into Room 4, where David takes control of a class being held in the room. Doris then manipulates the rest of the school to go into Room 4, telling them "a surprise" waits for them. Once all 136 students and 18 teachers are in the room, David establishes control by explaining his rules, then sitting next to the bomb; if he pulls the trigger, it will detonate. He shows off his firearms and explains he’ll kill children with a .22 because they’re innocent, while his .45 is reserved for teachers.

After a few minutes, Max Excell (Alan Peterson), the school principal who had been away, walks in and discovers the situation. David tells him to call the local authorities and tell them he demands $2,000,000 for each child, and if he doesn't return in 15 minutes, he will begin shooting students one by one.

Penny speeds to the local police station where she informs them of her father's plan, proving it by showing them Deppe and Mendenhall, still handcuffed. The police take the three for questioning, while they start informing the families. Ron begins to return to Cokeville, when he is informed of the hostage situation. He is still far out, but starts to rush towards Cokeville, as he is the nearest officer and every other one is out of town. In the school, gas from the bomb begins to leak and children are getting sick. One of the teachers convinces David to let them open the doors and windows. After the principal returns, David demands him to call the White House.

During the next few hours, the teachers create a "magic square" of masking tape on the floor where only David is allowed to go. The square serves as a boundary between the bomb and the children. Around this time, David is getting more and more agitated especially when Jason Hartley taunts him. When Jason puts his foot inside the magic square, David loses control and yells at Jason, who doesn’t flinch. Shortly after that, David leaves for the restroom, telling Doris to take his place at the bomb. While chatting with one of the teachers, Doris accidentally triggers the bomb by gesturing with her hand. It explodes and Doris is ignited in flames. The children are quickly evacuated as firefighters and paramedics are stationed right outside the doors and windows. David comes out of the bathroom to see Doris’ body completely engulfed in flames; he shoots her to put her out of her misery. He also shoots a teacher, John Miller (Joshua Cooper), in the back as the man leaves the classroom to help children escape.

Despite the fire from the blast, David shooting his gun, and his remaining ammo exploding in the heat of the fire, everyone but Doris still manages to evacuate safely. David returns to the bathroom where he kills himself, making him and Doris the only two to be killed during this event. Ron is informed of the bombing and he expresses that God isn't real. He arrives in town, rushing towards the school.

A few days later, Jason and Cindy are recovering well from burns and other minor injuries. Jason, however, seems traumatized and Ron takes him to see a psychologist. After the doctor meets privately with Jason for a while, he simply tells Ron that, "You and Jason need to sit down and have a nice, long talk." Ron and Claudia both talk to Jason, who then tells him "there were other people in the room." He confides in them that he saw people dressed all in white — angels. Ron doubts this but Claudia believes him after Jason points out a picture of his great-grandmother, who had passed away years earlier, saying she was his angel in the classroom. Ron questions this so Claudia convinces him to gather evidence just as he would for any other investigation.

He visits multiple families who inform him of similar stories from their children. He visits the investigating certified bomb expert, Rich Haskell (Rick Macy), from Sherrif's office in Rock Springs, who tells him that three of the five wires in the bomb were mysteriously cut; not broken, but cut clean. Haskell also mentions that the open windows and doors provided ventilation for the explosion. He is baffled that the shrapnel David put in the explosive was thrown around the room but no one was injured by it. Ron later tells Claudia that he found out every one of the hostages prayed some time during the crisis, and that some ran back into the room to help others. Despite all this information, Ron is reluctant to believe it.

On Sunday, Jason refuses to attend church unless his dad does so as well. Motivated to attend for Jason, Ron tries to make it through the meetings. But after the main meeting, Ron's doubts start to control him again and he tells Claudia that he can't do it. She tells him that he needs to control it or he could lose her and their children. Ron then overhears some words the bishop, John Teichart (Shawn Stevens), is saying in a class. He says that hatred will not be the answer but prayer will. Ron then goes to the youth room where they are singing "A Child's Prayer". He notices that almost all of the kids in the room have some injuries of some kind, and he becomes humble and asks God for forgiveness for doubting Him. Cindy and Jason notice him and run to him, and he asks for their forgiveness as well. That night, at the family prayer, Ron is saying it for the first time in a long time.

Cast
 Jasen Wade as Ron Hartley, the film's protagonist, one of the town's deputies who is questioning his faith as his children are taken hostage.
 Sarah Kent as Claudia Hartley, Ron's wife, who is worried about his skepticism.
 Kimball Stinger as Jason Hartley, Ron and Claudia's son, who tells them about seeing an angel of a deceased ancestor.
 Alexa Rae as Cindy Hartley, Ron and Claudia's daughter.
 Nathan Stevens as David Young, the film's antagonist, the ex-town marshal who holds Cokeville Elementary hostage.
 Kymberly Mellen as Doris Young, David's second wife, who accompanies him on his devious plan, but treats the children with much kindness.
 Caitlin EJ Meyer as Penny Young, David's second daughter from his previous marriage, who refuses to participate in his evil plan.
 Paul Hunt and Channon Voyce as Doyle Mendenhall and Gerald Deppe, two of David Young's friends who also refuse to participate in holding helpless, little children hostage.
 Alan Peterson as Max Excell, the Principal of Cokeville Elementary.
 Jillette Dayton as Christina "Tina" Cook, the Secretary of Cokeville Elementary.
 Barta Heiner as Verlene Bennion, an elderly teacher at Cokeville Elementary who suffers from smoke inhalation after the bomb goes off.
 Liz Christensen as Pat Bennion, Verlene's daughter-in-law and one of the teachers at Cokeville Elementary.
 Joshua Cooper as John Miller, a music teacher who is shot by David Young after the bomb goes off.
 Rick Macy as Rich Haskell, a certified bomb expert from the Sweetwater County Sherrif's department in Rock Springs.
 Shawn Stevens as John Teichert, the bishop of Cokeville's local congregation.

Production
The film was written and directed by T. C. Christensen, (The Work and the Glory, Only a Stonecutter, 17 Miracles, Ephraim's Rescue) and produced by Ron Tanner and Christensen. The film debuted on June 5, 2015, in select theaters in Utah, and then across the United States. The film was subsequently released on DVD and Blu-ray for distribution by Excel Entertainment Group through Deseret Book and affiliated retailers.

References

External links
 The Cokeville Miracle at Internet Movie Database
 
 "The Cokeville Miracle the American tragedy that never happened   because something changed things, this link has police report and photos of scene including outline of figure with wings blasted onto wall by explosion

Mormon cinema
2015 films
Crime films based on actual events
Films about school violence
Films set in 1986
Films set in Wyoming
Films about hostage takings
2010s adventure films
2010s biographical films
American biographical films
Films directed by T. C. Christensen
2010s English-language films
2010s American films